Saudi Arabia competed at the 2019 World Aquatics Championships in Gwangju, South Korea from 12 to 28 July.

Swimming

Saudi Arabia entered one swimmer.

Men

References

Nations at the 2019 World Aquatics Championships
2019
2019 in Saudi Arabian sport